Ardtoe is a place on the coast of Ardnamurchan, Lochaber, in the Highland council area of Scotland. It has sandy beaches with views to the island of Eigg. Ardtoe is situated at the head of the channel, which connects Kentra Bay to the sea. There is a Sea Fish Marine Unit of the Sea Fish Industry Authority located there.

References

External links

Populated places in Lochaber
Ardnamurchan